California poppies may refer to

 California Poppies, a British speedway team
 Eschscholzia, a genus of poppy, especially the species Eschscholzia californica